"Roller Coaster" is the debut single recorded by American singer and songwriter Erika Jayne for her debut studio album Pretty Mess (2009). Released as the album's lead single, the song was first distributed digitally on January 1, 2007, accompanied by a CD single released in the same month. The CD single included eleven remixes of the song in addition to the single version. The song was written by Peter Rafelson and Eric Kupper, and produced by Ike Dirty, Eric Kupper and Peter Rafelson.

Musically, the track is a house song, with EDM influences. "Roller Coaster" was well received by music critics. It peaked at number 30 on the Billboard Global Dance Songs, number one on the Hot Dance Club Songs chart and number 21 on U.S. Dance/Mix Show Airplay chart. People magazine described music video for "Roller Coaster", as "a monumental undertaking, shooting across multiple locations." The music video was shot in The Bahamas and at Stardust Resort and Casino in Las Vegas, Nevada. "It kind of turned out to be this all over the place, extravagant, over-the-top video," Erika Jayne told People in 2017.

Track listing

Charts

See also 
List of number-one dance singles of 2007 (US)

References 

2007 singles
2007 songs
Songs written by Eric Kupper